The 169th Massachusetts General Court, consisting of the Massachusetts Senate and the Massachusetts House of Representatives, met in 1975 and 1976 during the governorship of Michael Dukakis. Kevin B. Harrington served as president of the Senate and Thomas W. McGee served as speaker of the House.

Senators

Representatives

Images

See also
 94th United States Congress
 List of Massachusetts General Courts

References

Further reading

External links

 
 
 
 
 
 
  (1964-1994)

Political history of Massachusetts
Massachusetts legislative sessions
massachusetts
1975 in Massachusetts
massachusetts
1976 in Massachusetts